Radiation poisoning may refer to:

 Acute radiation syndrome, the short-term systemic health effects of a large radiation dose.
 Chronic radiation syndrome
 Electromagnetic hypersensitivity, the false belief that exposure to electromagnetic fields result in adverse medical symptoms
 The ingestion of radioactive material, notably in the poisoning of Alexander Litvinenko and Eben Byers
 The action of neutron poisons that inhibit nuclear chain reactions
 Any of the negative health effects of radiation other than teratogenesis, including
Radiation burns
Radiation-induced cancer
Radiation-induced lung injury
Radiation-induced thyroiditis
Radiation-induced cognitive decline